Italy and Wales have played each other at rugby union since 1994. A total of 31 matches have been played, with Wales winning 27, Italy winning three and one drawn match.

Summary

Overview

Records
Note: Date shown in brackets indicates when the record was or last set.

Results

References

Italy national rugby union team matches
Wales national rugby union team matches
Six Nations Championship
Rugby union rivalries in Italy
Rugby union rivalries in Wales